is a 1968 Japanese fantasy horror film directed by Yoshiyuki Kuroda. It is the second in a trilogy of films produced in the late 1960s, all of which focus around traditional Japanese monsters known as yōkai. (It was preceded by Yokai Monsters: 100 Monsters (1968), and was followed by Yokai Monsters: Along with Ghosts (1969).)

Yokai Monsters: Spook Warfare, along with the other two films in the series, was produced by Daiei Film and makes extensive use of tokusatsu special effects, with the majority of the creatures being represented by actors in costumes or puppets. The film was made in Fujicolor and Daieiscope.

In 2005, director Takashi Miike released The Great Yokai War, a modern retelling of the story which borrows many elements from Spook Warfare.

Plot
The film opens in the ruins of the Babylonian city of Ur, with a narration detailing a local legend pertaining to a great monster known as Daimon, who lays dormant in the rubble of the city. Four thousand years later, the ruins are disturbed by two treasure hunters and the monster Daimon is roused and proceeds to kill the intruders by causing a landslide. Following his release, Daimon decides to fly directly to Japan. There, he encounters a samurai known as Lord Hyogo Isobe, whom he kills and whose blood he consumes. Following this vampiric act, Daimon assumes the form of Isobe and makes his way to the lord's house. There he is met by Isobe's daughter, Lady Chie and fellow samurai Shinpachiro Mayama. After killing the family dog for barking at him, Daimon proceeds to tear down all altars in the house and orders his servants to have them burned. In his frenzy, he throws out an ornament which falls into a pond outside, rousing a kappa. The kappa decides to investigate the ruckus and happens to see Daimon (as Isobe) drinking the blood of Isobe's steward, Saheiji Kawano. When Saheiji also displays Daimon's mannerisms and orders the altars burned, the kappa becomes suspicious and attacks Daimon fruitlessly. Defeated and hurt, the kappa goes to the woods to seek out other yōkai to help him fight back Daimon.

The forest is home to the one-legged Kasa-obake, the frightening Futakuchi-onna, the long-necked Rokurokubi, the clay monster Nuppeppō and the wise Abura-sumashi. The yōkai do not believe the kappa's story, as they insist such a monster has never been found in Japan, citing a field guide and a coloring book about yōkai. Meanwhile, Lady Chie and Shinpachiro find the maid Shinobu, who has fallen victim to Daimon's vampirism. Shinpachiro decides to consult his uncle, a priest, who informs him that Lord Isobe is in fact dead and that some demon is masquerading as him. The priest gives Shinpachiro three candles to be placed around the room in which the demon is sitting while the priest chants destruction prayers in order to destroy the demon. While Shinpachiro sets up the candles correctly, Daimon manages to kill the priest by reversing his destructive magic. Daimon announces to Saheiji that he thirsts for younger blood than is afforded him at the house and so goes out looking for children with his retainers. The entourage attacks a local family, but not before the parents manage to slip their children out the back door. The parents are killed and the retainers ordered to sweep the area to find the children. While the samurai search, the children bump into the kappa and the other yōkai, who have set up camp in a local "monster's shrine". Upon hearing of the attack, the yōkai realise their error and agree to help the kappa drive Daimon away.

After scaring off the retainers in the forest, the yōkai set their sights on attacking Daimon. Rokurokubi is the first to attack, winding her neck around Daimon like a hangman's noose. However, Daimon proves to be too strong for her and simply ties her neck into a knot. The other yōkai try to attack him to much the same effect. Meanwhile, Shinpachiro attempts to ward off the demon using a warded jar. This, however, backfires when it instead entraps the yōkai. When Shinpachiro manages to shoot Daimon in the eye, Daimon is forced to abandon Lord Isobe's body and flee. Saheiji continues to resist and Daimon intercepts the new Magistrate, Lord Iori Ohdate, who was to be Lord Isobe's replacement. After drinking Ohdate's blood, Daimon assumes control of his body and returns to the house.

During this time, the yōkai remain trapped in the warded jar. In a fortunate turn, two of the yōkai not trapped in the jar - Futakuchi-onna and Kasa-obake - encounter the jar. While they are not able to free the monsters trapped inside by themselves, they are able to warn Shinpachiro about Saheiji. They make their way back to the house just in time to see Daimon (as Ohdate) give the order for Shinpachiro to be executed. Futakuchi-onna and Kasa-obake manage to convince Lady Chie to remove the ward keeping the yōkai trapped inside the jar so that they may be free to fight. Seeing that the yōkai have gotten free, Daimon creates half a dozen clones of himself in order to match their number. Just as the yōkai are on the verge of defeat, Kasa-obake returns with a large army of yōkai from all over Japan. Daimon continues to clone himself in order to match their numbers and the yōkai quickly realise that their only hope of victory is to remove the original Daimon's remaining eye. Daimon transforms himself into a giant, so Nuppeppō takes hold of Kasa-obake's leg as they float up to Daimon's face: stabbing him in the eye and defeating him once and for all. Following the yōkais victory, Shinpachiro is released from captivity. The yōkai all return to their natural habitat, having defended their home from the invading Daimon.

Cast

 Chikara Hashimoto as Daimon
 Akane Kawasaki as Chie
 Yoshihiko Aoyama as Shinhachiro
 Takashi Kanda as Hyogo
 Osamu Okawa as Iori
 Keiko Yukitomo as the two-headed woman
 Ikuko Mori as the long-necked monster
 Gen Kuroki as the river monster
 Tomoo Uchida
 Gen Kimura
 Hanji Wakai
 Hideki Hanamura
 Tokio Oki
 Hiromi Inoue
 Mari Kanda

References to Japanese culture 
As the title suggests, the film is largely focused around yōkai (妖怪, "strange things", "goblins"): strange mythological beings from Japanese folklore. This is in contrast to the other two films in the series, which were adaptations of period dramas in which the yōkai took a backseat to human actors. The yōkai are represented as playful and heroic, which is true of many yōkai found throughout Japan's history. However, yōkai such as Futakuchi-onna and Rokurokubi in particular are normally seen to be frightening creatures who are more often found in creepy kaidan (怪談, "strange stories") tales than children's movies.

The story of Spook Warfare shares many similarities with Mizuki Shigeru's GeGeGe no Kitarō (ゲゲゲの鬼太郎, Scary Kitarou) manga and anime series of the same name which was released around the same time. Academics also point out the film's inherent similarities to the story of Momotarō, who in folklore leads a group of native animals to reclaim the island of Kikaigashima from a group of demons who have overtaken it. The winning cry of "Japanese yōkai have won!" (日本の妖怪勝ったんやぞ！ Nippon no yōkai ga kattan ya zo!) can also be taken as an affirmation of pride for Japan's native culture. Other films, such as Isao Takahata's Pom Poko similarly follow this story of native monsters driving out invading forces.

Featured yōkai
Spook Warfare contains a significant roster of yōkai from many different sources. Some of the more notable ones are as follows:

Critical reception
The film has received positive reviews from critics and audiences. Critics praised the film's special effects, but noted with some concern that the violence and frightful nature of the film directly clashed with its supposedly child-friendly tone. Andrew Pragasam noted that while "[there] is plenty of humour and monster fun, [the] horrific elements are remarkably potent for a family film, with gory violence, chills and suspense."  Reviewer Chris Sims downplayed the violent aspects of the film, however, stating that "[as] strange as the movie and its weird monsters might seem, when you get right down to it it’s no more bizarre than the fairy tales we’re all used to on this side of the Pacific, right down to our stories of cursed spinning wheels and hair-accessible towers, and really, the themes are just as universal."

Influence and legacy
The costumes and puppets (many of which were produced for the first film) are some of the most recognisable realisations of traditional yōkai illustrations in cinema. The film has been the subject of numerous essays on the subject of yōkai and their role in modern media, with academics such as Zilia Papp and Michael Dylan Foster making reference to it in numerous publications.

In 2005, Takashi Miike remade the film as The Great Yokai War. The film borrowed numerous elements from the Yokai Monsters series as well as Mizuki Shigeru's Kitarō story of the same name. Mizuki himself even makes a cameo in the film.

Home media
The three 1960s films were released on Region 1 DVD by ADV Films in 2003. Yokai Monsters: Spook Warfare, was released as a Region Free disc (although it says Region 3 on the cover) in Thailand by Lionheart Pictures with optional original Japanese audio and English subtitles. They are currently out of print.

In 2021 Arrow Films released a Blu-ray box set (available as both Region B and Region A) under their Arrow Video label containing the entirety of the Yokai Monsters trilogy in high definition (with Spook Warfare being newly restored in 4K by Kadokawa Pictures) as well as the 2005 Takashi Miike directed remake of Spook Warfare, The Great Yokai War.

Notes

References

Bibliography

External links 
Yokai Monsters: Spook Warfare at AllMovie
 

1968 films
1960s Japanese-language films
Japanese fantasy adventure films
1960s children's fantasy films
1960s monster movies
Daiei Film tokusatsu films
1960s fantasy films
Japanese mythology
Yōkai in popular culture
Films based on Japanese myths and legends
Works about yōkai
1960s Japanese films